WLRW (94.5 FM) is a radio station broadcasting a hot adult contemporary radio format. It is licensed to Champaign, Illinois, and serves Central Illinois.  The station is owned by the Illini Radio Group subsidiary of Saga Communications. 

WLRW broadcasts using HD radio technology.  A "True Oldies" format airs on its HD2 digital subchannel, which is repeated on FM translator W250BL at 97.9 FM in Champaign-Urbana.

References

External links
Pure Oldies 97.9

LRW
Champaign, Illinois